Mula Dam is an earthfill and gravity dam on Mula river near Rahuri in Ahmednagar district of the state of Maharashtra in India.

Specifications

Purpose
 Irrigation: Has canals on either bank flowing downstream through the Ahmednagar district towards Aurangabad district irrigating the water deficient central eastern region of the Ahmednagar district. It is also the principal source of water for the Mahatma Phule Krishi Vidyapeeth.
 Drinking Water: It also provides drinking water supply to perennially water deficient Ahmednagar city. The water is transported via pipeline from the dam to the Ahmednagar city.

See also
 Dams in Maharashtra
 List of reservoirs and dams in India

References

Dams in Ahmednagar district
Dams completed in 1972
Earth-filled dams
Gravity dams
1972 establishments in Maharashtra